The 1985 Wightman Cup was the 57th edition of the annual women's team tennis competition between the United States and Great Britain. It was held at The College of William & Mary in Williamsburg, Virginia in the United States.

References

1985
1985 in tennis
1985 in women's tennis
1985 in American tennis
1985 in British sport 
1985 in sports in Virginia